Skipper's Island is a  nature reserve north of Kirby-le-Soken in Essex, England. It is owned and managed by the Essex Wildlife Trust.

The highest part of the island has thorn thickets, separated by grassy rides. The lowest land is saltmarsh, and there is also extensive rough pasture with brackish pools. Flora include sea hog's fennel and lax-flowered sea-lavender, and there are breeding birds such as shelducks and oystercatchers.

The island is connected to the mainland by two causeways, and access is only by prior arrangement with the trust.

References

Islands of Essex
Essex Wildlife Trust
Thorpe-le-Soken